Ingrid Vranovičová (born May 1, 1973, Bratislava) known by her stage name Ingola  is Slovak female singer, and has been active since 1995.

Discography 
 1995: Set me free
 1997: Svet patrí bláznom
 1999: Máš, čo si chcel
 2001: Som Tvoj anjel
 2002: Reč dvoch tiel
 2004: Popíš ma

In 1985, she has performed in "Páslo dievča pávy", the title song of the soundtrack of the Slovak movie "Perinbaba", directed by Juraj Jakubisko.

References 

1973 births
Living people
21st-century Slovak women singers
20th-century Slovak women singers